Hanna Mazgunova (born June 4, 1985 in Yelsk, Gomel) is a Belarusian discus thrower. Mazgunova represented Belarus at the 2008 Summer Olympics in Beijing, where she competed for the women's discus throw, along with her compatriots Ellina Zvereva and Iryna Yatchenko. She performed the best throw of 56.77 metres in her third attempt, despite having received two fouls throughout the entire qualifying round. Mazgunova, however, failed to advance into the final, as she placed twenty-ninth out of thirty-eight athletes in the overall rankings.

References

External links

NBC 2008 Olympics profile 

Living people
Belarusian female discus throwers
Olympic athletes of Belarus
Athletes (track and field) at the 2008 Summer Olympics
Sportspeople from Gomel
1985 births